Georges Halbout (15 December 1895 – 7 June 1986) was a French sculptor. His work was part of the sculpture event in the art competition at the 1924 Summer Olympics.

References

External links
 

1895 births
1986 deaths
19th-century French sculptors
20th-century French sculptors
French male sculptors
Olympic competitors in art competitions
Sculptors from Paris
19th-century French male artists